Adriano Pappalardo  (born 25 March 1945) is an Italian singer, actor and television personality.

Biography 
Born in Copertino, Lecce, Pappalardo started his career in 1971 with the song "Una donna". He obtained his first success in 1972 with the R'n'B single "E' ancora giorno", written as some of his other songs of the time by the couple Lucio Battisti-Mogol, which ranked second in the Italian hit parade. After some other minor hits, such as the songs "Segui lui" and "Come bambini", Pappalardo had his major success in 1979 with the ballad "Ricominciamo". In mid-eighties, following the commercial failure of the two albums Immersione and Oh! Era ora he  focused on his acting career, usually playing tough men and villains.

In 2003 Pappalardo had a significant personal success as a contestant of the reality show L'Isola dei Famosi (the Italian version of Celebrity Survivor). In 2004 he took part at the Sanremo Music Festival with the song "Nessun consiglio".

Discography

Studio albums 
 1972: Adriano Pappalardo (Numero Uno, ZSLN 55151)
 1973: California no (Numero Uno, DZSLN 55662)
 1975: Mi basta così (RCA, TPL 1 1159)
 1979: Non mi lasciare mai(RCA, PL 31505)
 1982: Immersione (Numero Uno, ZPLN 34165)
 1983: Oh! Era ora (Numero Uno, 81990)
 1988: Sandy (CGD, 20836)

Filmography 
     A tu per tu (1984)
     Rimini Rimini (1987)
     Rimini Rimini – Un anno dopo (1988)
     La piovra,  (1989)
     Classe di ferro (TV Series, 1989–1991)
     Italian Restaurant (TV Series, 1994)
     Racket (TV Series, 1997)
     Kaputt Mundi (1998)
     This Is Not Paradise (2000)
     Canone inverso – Making Love (2000)
     Saint Rita (TV Movie, 2004)
     Il falco e la colomba (TV Series, 2009)

References

External links 

 

1945 births
Italian pop singers
Living people
People from the Province of Lecce
Italian male film actors
Italian male television actors
Participants in Italian reality television series